Utam Rusdiana (born 6 March 1995) is an Indonesian professional footballer who plays as a goalkeeper.

Club career

Persekat Tegal
In 2021, Rusdiana signed a contract with Indonesian Liga 2 club Persekat Tegal. He made his league debut on 27 September in a 3–1 win against Badak Lampung at the Gelora Bung Karno Madya Stadium, Jakarta.

Dewa United
Rusdiana was signed for Dewa United to play in Liga 1 in the 2022–23 season.

Career statistics

Club

Honours

Clubs 
Arema 
 Indonesian Inter Island Cup: 2014/15
 Indonesia President's Cup: 2017, 2019

References

External links
 Utam Rusdiana at Soccerway
 Utam Rusdiana at Liga Indonesia

1995 births
Living people
Indonesian footballers
People from Sidoarjo Regency
Sportspeople from East Java
Arema F.C. players
Liga 1 (Indonesia) players
Association football goalkeepers
Dewa United F.C. players